Robert Wayne Henry, III (born January 26, 1990) is a former American football safety. He previously played safety and quarterback for the Purdue Boilermakers.

Henry attended Trinity Catholic High School in Ocala, Florida, where he played both football and baseball, and competed in track & field. Henry led Trinity Catholic to two conference championships and a runner-up in the 2B State Championship game. He ended his high school football career with over 4,300 total yards and 39 touchdowns. After his senior season, he moved on to Purdue University where he redshirted in 2009.

In his first collegiate appearance, Henry ran for 16-yards against Notre Dame. He would later assume the starting quarterback position after an injury to Robert Marve. His first career start was against Northwestern, which saw him lead the Boilermakers to a 20–17 win on the road lead by his career high, 132 yards rushing. Henry went on to start 5 games for the season, with a 3-game set back, which he injured a finger on his throwing hand. Against Minnesota he had a career-high running for 3 touchdowns. In the final game of the season against Indiana he had a career-high 252 yard passing and 3 touchdown passes. He became the first Purdue quarterback to lead the Boilermakers in both passing and rushing yardage in the same season, with 996 passing yards and 547 yards rushing.

After a starting quarterback battle in the off season, Henry was named the Boilermakers' starting quarterback for the 2011 season and was voted co-captain, but he tore the ACL in his right knee. With backup Marve still recovering from his owen ACL injury, Caleb TerBush took over as the starting quarterback in their place.

Henry returned in 2012, and was named the third-string quarterback behind TerBush and Marve. To get on the field, the Boilermakers used Henry as both a running back and wide receiver, in addition to quarterbacking.

Henry was named the starting quarterback for the Boilermakers during 2013 fall camp. Henry beat out true freshman, Danny Etling, and redshirt freshman, Austin Appleby. Henry started the first 5 games of the season for the Boilermakers, before being replaced just before halftime during their 5 game of the season by Etling. The week following Henry's removal from quarterback, he was moved to safety.

High school career 
Henry went to Trinity Catholic High School in Ocala, Florida.  There he was coached by John Brantley, and was a Mr. Football finalist and first team all-state  after passing for 2,600 yards and 24 touchdowns as senior, while rushing for 350 yards and six touchdowns. He led the Celtics to the 2B state championship game, but lost 21–17 to Pahokee High School. As a result, he was named to Reebok Florida Phenoms third team. It wasn't clear if he would start as a junior, but he won the battle, and went on to pass for 1,100 yards and 10 touchdowns while also rushing for 250 yards and five scores, while missing some time with a knee injury.
He was a two-time all-county selection in football, and led his team to state finals his senior season. As a freshman and sophomore, he played free safety and wide receiver, while John Brantley was at quarterback. He was a first team all-division his freshman and sophomore seasons. He also participated in basketball and track and field.

Henry committed to Purdue University on July 23, 2008. He choose Purdue over football scholarships from Vanderbilt University and Northern Illinois University.

College career

2009 season 
In 2009, Henry sat for the season using his redshirt to learn head coach Danny Hope's offense.

2010 season 
The 2010 season began with Henry slated second on the depth chart behind transfer, Robert Marve.  However, Hope said that Henry would see playing time even if the game was still undecided. Against Notre Dame, Henry only got three carries for 16 yards. After a win against Minnesota, he was named the Big Ten Freshman of the Week. He was named the team's Leonard Wilson Award winner (unselfishness and dedication). He was also the first Purdue quarterback in school history to lead the team in both rushing and passing yardage in a season. He completed 86 of 162 pass attempts (53.1 percent) for 996 yards with eight touchdowns and seven interceptions, while rushing for 547 yards and four touchdowns on 104 attempts (5.3 yards per carry). For the season, Henry appeared in 11 games, making seven starts in 2010.

2011 season 
After a starting quarterback battle in the off season, Henry was named the Boilermakers' starting quarterback for the 2011 season, but he tore the ACL in his right knee. With backup Marve still recovering from his own ACL injury, Caleb TerBush took over as the starting quarterback in their place.

2012 season 
Henry entered his junior season looking at splitting playing time with TerBush and Marve. With TerBush working mostly with the first team, he was expected to start the first game of the year, until it was announced (one hour prior to gametime) that he had been suspended and Marve was the starting quarterback. Henry was promoted to second string, seeing most of his action in the second half of play. Henry finished the day 7 for 9 passing for 1 touchdown and 1 interception. After not playing in the Notre Dame game, Henry was named the backup against Eastern Michigan, as Marve was sidelined with his third ACL tear. Henry played a few plays in the second quarter, before seeing increased playing time in the 3rd quarter due to the Boilermakers large lead. Most of his plays came throwing the ball, as Coach Hope felt that was his largest area in need of improvement.

2013 season 
With Marve and TerBush out of the mix due to graduation, and new Purdue head coach Darrell Hazell, Henry entered fall camp with the Boilermakers competing with freshmen Danny Etling and Austin Appleby for Purdue's starting quarterback spot. Two weeks before the regular season opener at Cincinnati, Hazell named Henry Purdue's starting quarterback.

Statistics 
As of the end of the 2013 regular season, Henry's statistics are as follows:

Henry had a 3–9 career record as the starting quarterback for Purdue.

Professional career 
Prior to the 2014 NFL Draft, Henry was projected to be undrafted by NFLDraftScout.com. He was rated as the thirty-fourth-best quarterback in the draft.

On May 10, 2014, Henry signed as an undrafted free agent with the Oakland Raiders.

Playing style 
Henry is a dual-threat quarterback, known more for his ability to run the ball, than for his throwing arm.

References

External links 
 
 Purdue profile

1990 births
Living people
American football quarterbacks
Purdue Boilermakers football players
Players of American football from Florida
Sportspeople from Ocala, Florida